The 1Malaysia  Square is a town square in Klebang, Melaka, Malaysia.

History
The square was officiated by Prime Minister Najib Razak in February 2012. In December 2016, more than 20,000 peoples visited 1Malaysia Square to celebrate 755 years of Malacca.

Features
Around the square are the Klebang Beach and Submarine Museum.

See also
 List of tourist attractions in Malacca
 1Malaysia

References

1Malaysia
2012 establishments in Malaysia
Buildings and structures completed in 2012
Central Melaka District
Squares in Malacca